Roberto Cavalli (born 15 November 1940) is an Italian fashion designer and inventor. He is known for exotic prints and for creating the sand-blasted look for jeans. The high-end Italian fashion house Roberto Cavalli sells luxury clothing, perfume and leather accessories. Former Acne Studios creative consultant Paul Surridge succeeded Peter Dundas as creative director for the brand in May 2017.

Biography
Roberto Cavalli was born in Florence, Italy. His grandfather, Giuseppe Rossi, was an artist and a member of the Macchiaioli Movement, whose work is exhibited in the Uffizi Gallery.  Cavalli enrolled at the local Art Institute, concentrating in textile print. While still a student, he made a series of flower prints on knit that caught the attention of major Italian hosiery factories.

In the early 1970s, he invented and patented a printing procedure on leather, and started creating patchworks of different materials. He debuted these techniques in Paris, immediately getting commissions from the likes of Hermès and Pierre Cardin. At age 32, he presented his first namesake collection at the Salon for Prêt-à-Porter in Paris. He brought it to the catwalks of the Sala Bianca of Palazzo Pitti in Florence, and later on those of Milano Collezioni, jeans made of printed denim, intarsia leathers, brocade, and wild prints. He then opened his first boutique in 1972 in Saint-Tropez.

In 1980, Roberto Cavalli married Eva Düringer, a former Miss Austria and first runner-up of the Miss Universe 1977 pageant. In Milan in 1994, Cavalli presented the first sand-blasted jeans. By December of the same year, he had opened boutiques in Saint Barth, in the French Caribbean, followed by others in Venice and Saint-Tropez. Besides the main line, which is sold in over fifty countries worldwide, Roberto Cavalli designs RC Menswear as well as the youth aimed line Just Cavalli, launched in 2000  and comprising today men’s wear, women’s wear and accessories, eyewear, watches, jewelry, perfumes, underwear, and beachwear. There is also the Angels & Devils Children Collection, the Class line, two underwear collections, shoes, eyewear, watches and perfumes. In 2002, Cavalli opened his first café-store in Florence, revamping it with his signature animal prints. This was shortly followed by the opening in Milan of the Just Cavalli café at Torre Branca and another boutique on Via della Spiga.

Roberto Cavalli was a judge at the Miss Universe 1977 pageant where his future wife (Eva Duringer) was a contestant, who represented Austria and won second place. The woman that won was the first Black Miss Universe (Miss Trinidad and Tobago: Janelle Commissiong). In July 2011, his company collection was presented at the catwalk of The Brandery fashion show in Barcelona.

Cavalli has five children: Tommaso and Christiana from his first marriage, and Robert, Sara, and Daniele from his second marriage. Cavalli and his second wife Eva divorced in 2010. Model Sandra Nilsson, who is 45 years his junior, has been his partner since 2014.

On June 18, 2013, he was awarded an Honorary Master Diploma in Fashion Management from Domus Academy in Milan, during a ceremony after which he held a lectio magistralis.

On 8 March 2023, it was announced that Roberto Cavalli became father at the age of 82 of his sixth child, born from his relationship with Sandra Nilsson.The child was given the name Giorgio in honor and memory his father who was shot by the Nazis in the Cavriglia massacre in 1944.

Brand
As of January 2014, Cavalli returned to the role of men's creative director from his son, Daniele Cavalli, starting with the 2014 fall collection, appointing Martyn Bal as his righthand man. Also, on 24 January 2014, Gianluca Brozzetti (CEO) and Carlo Di Biagio (COO) announced they were leaving the fashion brand.

In May 2014, Cavalli approached Investcorp, an investment firm in the Persian Gulf, as a potential buyer of a stake in his fashion brand.

On March 29, 2019, Roberto Cavalli closed its US stores and is preparing to liquidate its North American operations.  On the same day the brand announced plans to seek an agreement with creditors in a bid to keep the business afloat while it continues to search for an investor, security guards entered the company's US stores—including approximately seven full-line stores and a handful of off-price outlets—and instructed employees to leave, according to two salespeople. Employees were told by senior corporate management that the fashion house planned to close its brick-and-mortar stores in the US as the business restructures.

As a result of these changes, several corporate executives, including US CEO Salvatore Tramuto, have resigned. The US corporate team was notified on March 22 that the North American operation, which operates as Art Fashion Corp., was insolvent and that it would need to close all stores, according to a senior-level executive with direct knowledge of the information.

A Cavalli spokesman has confirmed that Art Fashion Corp. will file for Chapter 7 bankruptcy—also known as liquidation bankruptcy—in the US this week. E-commerce operations were temporarily shut down until logistics can be re-routed through the European operation, he said. The company's 93 US employees were terminated on Friday, though they will receive a final paycheck this week, the spokesman said.

Many leading models have worked for the brand: Jessica Stam, Eva Riccobono, Laetitia Casta, Natasha Poly, Mariacarla Boscono, Karen Elson, Karolina Kurkova and Ivan Olita. amongst others.

In 2019, DAMAC Properties's Hussain Sajwani completed the acquisition of Italian fashion group Roberto Cavalli.

Criticism
Cavalli was sharply criticized in 2004 by the Hindu community for marketing a line of feminine underwear (designed for Harrods) which featured the images of Hindu goddesses.   The line was eventually withdrawn and formal apologies were made.

The Maktab Tarighat Oveyssi Shahmaghsoudi school of Islamic Sufism accused Cavalli of copying their "sacred emblem" for branding the Just Cavalli line.  The Sufi school brought forth a proceeding in Europe to the Office for Harmonization in the Internal Market (OHIM). "On 16 May 2014, the OHIM pronounced itself in the first degree rejecting the request made by the School to invalidate the Just Cavalli logo.  The Court states that the two logos are not mistakable and do not present any similarities." Nonetheless, students of the Sufi school have continued their protest.

References

External links

RobertoCavalli.com: Official website

RobertoCavalliBlog.com - Official blog
ImagineFashion.com: Roberto Cavalli in fashion art film
Vogue.uk: Roberto Cavalli interview

1940 births
Living people
20th-century Italian inventors
Fashion designers from Florence
Italian fashion designers